Alexander Karonias is a British former professional rugby union player who made 97 appearances for London Scottish between 2008 and 2014.

References

1980s births
Living people
Year of birth uncertain
British rugby union players
London Scottish F.C. players
Place of birth missing (living people)